Lucija Larisi (born 5 December 1975) is a Slovenian biathlete. She competed at the 1998 Winter Olympics and the 2002 Winter Olympics.

References

1975 births
Living people
Biathletes at the 1998 Winter Olympics
Biathletes at the 2002 Winter Olympics
Slovenian female biathletes
Olympic biathletes of Slovenia